Ideomancer was a Canadian quarterly online speculative fiction magazine whose contents included science fiction, fantasy, slipstream, horror, flash fiction and speculative poetry, along with reviews and interviews. The first issue debuted in 2001, and in 2002 the magazine was "rebooted" with new numbering under new editorship. Volume 1 of the current Ideomancer was established in 2002.

Chris Clarke and Mikal Trimm, who were on the original Ideomancer editorial team, edited an ebook anthology called Ideomancer Unbound published by Fictionwise in 2002. It includes stories by Charles Coleman Finlay, Jack Dann, Jeff VanderMeer, Tobias S. Buckell, Deborah Biancotti, Mike Resnick, and Claire McKenna, among others. Cover art is by Cat Sparks.

As of 2019, it appears that the magazine is now defunct. It ceased publication sometime after April 20, 2015, which was the date of the last tweet on their Twitter account.

Contributing writers
In addition to those featured in Ideomancer Unbound, notable authors published by Ideomancer included Nicole Kornher-Stace, Ted Kosmatka, Ruth Nestvold, Christopher Barzak, and Sarah Monette.

Staff

Awards and recognition
Works published in Ideomancer have received the following awards:

2009
 "Sea Change", by Erica L. Satifka, honorable mention, The Year's Best Science Fiction: Twenty-Sixth Annual Collection

2008
 "Deadnauts", by Ted Kosmatka, long list, British Science Fiction Award; honorable mention, The Year's Best Science Fiction: Twenty-Fifth Annual Collection
 "Screamers", by Yoon Ha Lee, honorable mention, The Year's Best Science Fiction: Twenty-Fifth Annual Collection
 "Far Side of the Moon", by Ruth Nestvold, honorable mention, The Year's Best Science Fiction: Twenty-Fifth Annual Collection
 "Things With Sharp Teeth", by Astrid Atkinson, honorable mention, Year's Best Fantasy and Horror
 "Winner", by Kyri Freeman, honorable mention, Year's Best Fantasy and Horror

2007
 "Triple Helix", by Ruth Nestvold, honorable mention, The Year's Best Science Fiction: Twenty-Fourth Annual Collection
 "Nine Lives", by Becca de la Rosa, honorable mention, Year's Best Fantasy and Horror

2006
 "The Sun's Kiss", by Yoon Ha Lee, honorable mention, The Year's Best Science Fiction: Twenty-Third Annual Collection
 "Whale Falls", by Steve Mohan, Jr, honorable mention, The Year's Best Science Fiction: Twenty-Third Annual Collection

2003
 "Mr Neblin's Boy", by Nancy Proctor, honorable mention, Year's Best Fantasy and Horror
 "Horsethieves and Preachermen", by Christopher Rowe, honorable mention, Year's Best Fantasy and Horror

See also
 Science fiction magazine
 Fantasy fiction magazine
 Horror fiction magazine

References

External links
 Ideomancer website

Defunct magazines published in Canada
Fantasy fiction magazines
Horror fiction magazines
Magazines established in 2001
Magazines disestablished in 2015
Online magazines published in Canada
Quarterly magazines published in Canada
Science fiction magazines published in Canada
Science fiction webzines